Paalai is a 2011 Indian Tamil-language period film written and directed by Senthamizhan, who had previously assisted director Ram in Katradhu Thamizh. Based on Sangam literature, the film is set in 300 BC years and starred debutant Sunil Kumar and Shammu in pivotal roles. The film released with little publicity in November 2011.

Cast
Sunil Kumar as Valan
Shammu as Kaayampoo
Prof. V. Natarajan
Jayan
Krishnagiri
Julu

Production
The film was shot extensively in the forests of Thanjavur, Mysore and Sathyamangalam. Actress Shammu was the only professional actress to be cast in the film and Sunil Kumar prepared for his role by standing for hours under the sun to sport a tan as well as learning the basics of different forms of martial arts. It became the actress's final film before she left the film industry to complete her education. Members of the Irula tribe also acted in the film.

Release
The film was widely appreciated by critics though it was not released in many theaters. The film was privately screened in Norway a week later and was prepared for a theatrical release in the country shortly after, with the makers claiming it would be the first Tamil film to be released in regular cinema halls across Norway. The film was screened at the Norway International Film Festival and then subsequently at the 10th International Tamil Film Festival in Canada in 2012. It has won the best social awareness movie in Norway international film festival.

Soundtrack
Ved Shanker Sugavanam is the debudant music director. All the lyrics were written by M. Senthamizhan. There are five tracks in the film.

1. "Maayama Mayaa"
2. "Yaado Yaadho" (Male)
3. "Paalai Theme"
4. "Yaadho Yaadho" (Female)
5. "Hey Kollare"

References

External links

2011 films
2010s Tamil-language films
Films set in ancient India
Films scored by Ved Shankar